Ylilauta  is a Finnish imageboard. It was founded on February 20, 2011 to unite the two former most popular Finnish imageboards, Kotilauta and Lauta.net. Ylilauta is one of the most popular websites in Finland, and on the Finnish-speaking Internet. In 2011 "Ylilauta" was the fourth most searched word on Google in Finland.

Ylilauta has tens of thousands of users every day, and in June 2022 it was Similarweb's 35th most popular site in Finland according to listing. And in December 2020, Ylilauta had more than 140 million sent messages.

Charity campaigns 
Users of Ylilauta twice gathered a consolatory prize for two Finnish YouTubers who had not received an award at the annual Tubecon event, despite winning in the People's Choice category. The first was YouTuber markoboy87, who received a television and a PlayStation console, whereas niilo22, who was the second winner, received a bicycle, a Moccamaster coffee percolator, a PlayStation and an LED television set.

Data leak in 2011 
In 2011, users of Ylilauta published thousands of Finnish user account details for multiple Finnish websites, which led to Finland's largest series of data leaks.

Role in the data breach in 2020 
In October 2020 an anonymous hacker used Ylilauta to share data which he had acquired illegally in a data breach from the Vastaamo psychotherapist centre. The hacker(s) had previously threatened Vastaamo that they would release the data they had acquired, which Vastaamo had reported to the police. Ylilauta administration soon removed the data from the site. Technical director of F-Secure Mikko Hyppönen later approached the Ylilauta user base, requesting that any person who had downloaded a specific file that contained all the data acquired in the breach send a copy of it to the police, as it might contain technical information that might help the criminal investigation.

See also 

 2channel, in Japan
 4chan, international in English language
 8chan, international in English language
 Futaba Channel, in Japan
 Ilbe Storehouse, in Japan

References

Further reading

External links 
 

Internet forums
Finnish websites
Imageboards
Internet properties established in 2011